Cassinia × adunca is a species of flowering plant in the family Asteraceae and is endemic to South Australia. It was first formally described in 1853 by Otto Wilhelm Sonder in the journal Linnaea: ein Journal für die Botanik in ihrem ganzen Umfange, oder Beiträge zur Pflanzenkunde from an unpublished description by Ferdinand von Mueller. It is considered to be a hybrid, possibly between Cassinia complanata and C. tegulata.

References

adunca
Asterales of Australia
Flora of South Australia
Plants described in 1853
Taxa named by Otto Wilhelm Sonder